Vâlcele is a commune in Olt County, Muntenia, Romania. It is composed of three villages: Bărcănești, Vâlcele and Vâlcelele de Sus.

Natives
 Alexandra Sicoe

References

Communes in Olt County
Localities in Muntenia